Coelacanthidae is an extinct family of coelacanths found in freshwater and marine strata throughout the world, originating during the Permian, and finally dying out during the Jurassic.

The modern-day genus Latimeria is often erroneously thought to be in this family, when, in fact, it is the type genus of the more advanced family Latimeriidae, which appeared some time during the Triassic.

References 

 
Permian bony fish
Triassic bony fish
Jurassic bony fish
Jurassic extinctions
Prehistoric lobe-finned fish families
Permian first appearances